Commodore Cicero Price (2 December 1805 – 24 November 1888) was an officer in the United States Navy. He served in the American Civil War and was commander of the East India Squadron.

Naval career
Price  was born in Lancaster, Kentucky, on 2 December 1805. He was appointed a midshipman from Kentucky on 1 February 1826 and was attached to the frigate  in the Brazil Squadron from 1826 to 1828 and to the sloop-of-war  and the schooner  in the West Indies Squadron during periods between  1828 and 1831. He was promoted to passed midshipman on 28 April 1832.

Price served aboard the schooner   from 1834 to 1837 and on the ship-of-the-line  in the Pacific Squadron from 1837 to 1838, and was promoted to lieutenant on 6 September 1837.  He next had duty aboard the sidewheel steamer  along the United States East Coast in 1840 and aboard the ship-of-the-line   in the Brazil Squadron and the Mediterranean Squadron from 1841 to 1843 and during part of 1844. He was assigned to a receiving ship at the New York Navy Yard in Brooklyn, New York, during 1845 and to the sloop-of-war  in the Africa Squadron during 1846. He was aboard Marion again in 1848 and 1849 while she was in the Mediterranean Squadron.

After duty at the Memphis Navy Yard in Memphis, Tennessee, in 1850, Price served on the staff of the Pacific Squadron in 1851, was on ordnance duty during 1853, and was assigned to the receiving ship at Norfolk Navy Yard in Portsmouth, Virginia, in 1854. Promoted to commander on 14 September 1855, he was first lieutenant aboard the sloop-of-war  in the Mediterranean Squadron during parts of 1855 and 1856.

After the American Civil War broke out in April 1861, Price was commanding officer of the steamer  in the Gulf Blockading Squadron in the Gulf of Mexico, taking part in the Union blockade of the Confederate States of America. Promoted to captain on 16 July 1862, he was commanding officer of the sloop-of-war  from 1862 to 1865, serving also as commander of the East India Squadron from 23 September 1862 to 11 August 1865, engaged in the protection of American commerce from Confederate privateers in East Asia and the Western Pacific through the end of the war in April 1865.

Promoted to commodore on 28 September or 29 December 1866 (sources vary), Price retired from the Navy on 2 December 1867 upon reaching the statutory retirement age of 62.

Personal life
Price was married to the former Elizabeth Homer Paine (1828–1910). They had a son and three daughters, Lilian Warren Price Hammersley (1854–1909),  Lucy Price Renshaw (1858–1896), and Cora Elizabeth Price (1857-1875).  

After the death of her first husband, the New York real-estate millionaire Louis Carré Hamersley, Lilian became the Duchess of Marlborough, marrying George Spencer-Churchill, 8th Duke of Marlborough, about five months before Price's death.

Death
After a few days of illness, Price died of pleuropneumonia in Troy on the evening of 24 November 1888.

See also

Notes

References
Naval History and Heritage Command: Officers of the Continental and U.S. Navy and Marine Corps, 1775-1900.
Hamersly, Lewis Randolph. The Records of Living Officers of the U.S. Navy and Marine Corps, Fourth Edition, Philadelphia: L. R. Hamersly & Company, 1890.
Tolley, Kemp, Yangtze Patrol: The U.S. Navy in China, Annapolis, Maryland: Naval Institute Press, 1971 .

1805 births
1888 deaths
United States Navy commodores
Union Navy officers
People of Kentucky in the American Civil War
People from Lancaster, Kentucky
Deaths from lung disease
Infectious disease deaths in New York (state)
Burials at Oakwood Cemetery (Troy, New York)